The 2003 Wyoming Cowboys football team represented the University of Wyoming in the 2003 NCAA Division I-A football season. The team's head coach was Joe Glenn, who was in his first year at Wyoming. They played their home games at War Memorial Stadium in Laramie, Wyoming, and competed in the Mountain West Conference.

Schedule

References

Wyoming Cowboys
Wyoming Cowboys football seasons
Wyoming Cowboys football